Academy of Music of the University of Ljubljana is the main junior conservatory in Slovenia. The school has its origin in the Music School of the Slovene Philharmonic Society (founded 1821, indirectly descended from the Ljubljana Philharmonic Academy of Johann Berthold von Höffer, 1701), which became the basis of the Ljubljana Conservatory in 1919, and then the Ljubljana Academy of Music in 1939. The secondary programme became an independent institution as the Ljubljana Music and Ballet Conservatory in 1953.

Former deans of the academy 
Julij Betetto (1933–1940)
Anton Trost (1940–?)
Leon Pfeifer
Lucijan Marija Škerjanc (1946–1947)
Marijan Lipovšek
Franjo Schiffer
Karlo Rupel
Janko Ravnik
Mihael Gunzek (1976–1979)
Danijel Škerl (–1986)
Marjan Gabrijelčič (1986–1994)
Dejan Bravničar (1994–2002)
Pavel Mihelčič (2002–2009)
Andrej Grafenauer (2009–2017)
Marko Vatovec (2017–2021)

References

External links
 Academy of Music. Official website.
 

Music schools in Slovenia
Music